Tañes is a parish (administrative division) in Caso, a municipality within the province and autonomous community of Asturias, in northern Spain.

The postal code is 33994.

Villages and hamlets 
Abantru
Prieres
Tañes

References 

Parishes in Caso